The 1986 Metro Conference men's basketball tournament was held March 6–8 at Freedom Hall in Louisville, Kentucky. 

Louisville defeated  in the championship game, 88–79, to win their fifth Metro men's basketball tournament.

The Cardinals received an automatic bid to the 1986 NCAA Tournament, and would go on to win the National championship.

Format
All seven of the conference's members participated. They were seeded based on regular season conference records, with the top team earning a bye into the semifinal round. The other six teams entered into the preliminary first round.

Bracket

References

Metro Conference men's basketball tournament
Tournament
Metro Conference men's basketball tournament
Metro Conference men's basketball tournament